The Paris Zoological Park, formerly known as the Bois de Vincennes Zoological Park, and commonly called the Vincennes Zoo, is a facility of the National Museum of Natural History, located in the 12th arrondissement of Paris, which covers an area of  in the bois de Vincennes. Designed to complement the Ménagerie du Jardin des plantes, this zoo is dedicated to the observation of animal behavior in a more suitable environment. This zoo include a greenhouse of  sheltering a tropical rainforest climate.

The zoo was closed between 30 November 2008 and 12 April 2014 after becoming dilapidated and too small for its residents, according to criteria of the twenty-first century. The renovation, which began on 7 December 2011, took place over nearly two and a half years. The pens have been fully reviewed and grouped into five major natural environments (called biozones). The work allowed them to reach modern standards for animal welfare, public safety and museology, with increased attention to the respect of the environment.

External links

Zoos in France
Buildings and structures in Paris
Tourist attractions in Paris
Zoos established in 1934
Buildings and structures in the 12th arrondissement of Paris
Organizations based in Paris